Louis-Marc Aubry (born November 11, 1991) is a Canadian professional ice hockey player who is currently playing for Kölner Haie of the Deutsche Eishockey Liga (DEL). Aubry was drafted 81st overall by the Detroit Red Wings in the 2010 NHL Entry Draft.

Playing career

Junior
During the 2008–09 QMJHL season, in his rookie season, Aubry recorded 10 goals and 12 assists in 65 games for the Montreal Juniors. Aubry also played in 10 playoff games for the club, recording two goals and two assists.

During the 2009–10 QMJHL season, Aubry played 66 games for the Montreal Juniors, recording 15 goals and 18 assists. In seven playoff games for Montreal, Aubry recorded one goal and one assist. Aubry scored an empty net goal for the victorious Team Cherry at the 2010 CHL Top Prospects Game.

During the 2010–11 QMJHL season, Aubry started off the year strong as a member of the Montreal Juniors before going down with an injury. Aubry played in 35 games, finishing the season with 13 goals and 12 assists. In 10 playoff games for Montreal, Aubry recorded five goals and one assist.

Professional
On November 9, 2010, the Detroit Red Wings signed Aubry to a three-year entry-level contract.

He was good 
During the 2011–12 AHL season, Aubry made his professional hockey debut as a 20-year-old, skating in 62 games for Detroit's AHL affiliate Grand Rapids Griffins, where he recorded five goals and 11 assists.

During the 2012–13 AHL season, Aubry recorded four goals and eight assists in 64 games. The Griffins finished first in the Midwest Division and captured the Calder Cup championship. Aubrey played in 14 of 24 playoff games, recording one assist.

In the following 2014–15 season, Aubry recorded five goals and 11 assists in 67 games. On July 15, 2015, the Red Wings signed Aubry to a one-year contract extension. During the 2015–16 season, Aubry recorded career highs in points (29), goals (12), assists (17), and games played (75). On August 18, 2016, Aubry signed a one-year contract with the Grand Rapids Griffins.

He made 36 appearances for the Griffins in the 2016–17 campaign, scoring four goals and assisting on five more, before taking his game to Germany, signing with DEL side Eisbären Berlin on February 2, 2017. He inked a deal for the remainder of the season with the Eisbären squad and on May 16, 2017, put pen to paper on a fresh one-year deal.

Having left Berlin as a free agent after four seasons, Aubry continued in the DEL in agreeing to a one-year contract with ERC Ingolstadt on November 16, 2020.

On May 6, 2022, Aubry joined his third DEL club as a free agent, signing a one-year contract with Kölner Haie for the 2022–23 season.

Career statistics

Awards and honors

References

External links

1991 births
Living people
Canadian ice hockey centres
Canadian expatriate ice hockey players in Germany
Detroit Red Wings draft picks
Eisbären Berlin players
French Quebecers
Grand Rapids Griffins players
Ice hockey people from Quebec
ERC Ingolstadt players
Montreal Junior Hockey Club players
Sportspeople from Trois-Rivières
Toledo Walleye players